The 2017 Ivy League men's soccer season was the 63rd season of men's varsity soccer in the conference.
The Dartmouth Big Green entered the 2017 season as returning league champions, with hopes to claim the Ivy League title again for a fourth consecutive season. The Big Green became Ivy League champions after a 1-0 win against Cornell on November 6, 2017, clinching the Ivy League title for the fourth consecutive season.

Stadiums and locations

Regular season

Results

Rankings

Postseason

NCAA Tournament

All-Ivy League awards and teams 

 First team

 Second team

 Honorable Mention

See also 

 2017 NCAA Division I men's soccer season

References 

 
2017 NCAA Division I men's soccer season